Swinderby is a village and civil parish in the North Kesteven district of Lincolnshire, England. Village population is 773, reducing to 648 (including Morton Hall) at the 2011 census.

History
The name 'Swinderby' is assumed to have originated either from "sundri + by" (southern farmstead or village), or "svin + djur + by" (farmstead where pigs are kept); in Doomsday it is referred to as "Sunderby" and "Suindrebi".

The settlement might date back to at least Roman times as Roman pottery and parts of Fosse Way have been found. Some village buildings date back to the 17th century.

The church of All Saints is predominantly Norman and Early English, however restoration was carried out in 1854, 1879 and 1910.

In 1872 there was a Wesleyan chapel.

Community
The village has a public house, a church, a village hall, two playing fields and a primary school with nursery.

The school is the All Saints' Church of England Primary School, which was rated as overall Grade 2 (good), in its 2012 Ofsted inspection.

Swinderby is close to the now closed RAF airfield, RAF Swinderby, which holds a bi-monthly antique and collectors fair that has been featured on BBC1's Bargain Hunt.

News and event notices are carried in the village Swinderby Link-up magazine. This publication also includes adverts from local businesses.

References

External links

Swinderby All Saints Primary School. Retrieved 7 April 2011

Villages in Lincolnshire
Civil parishes in Lincolnshire
North Kesteven District